The 2021–22 Slovenian PrvaLiga was the 31st edition of the Slovenian PrvaLiga since its establishment in 1991. The season began on 16 July 2021 and ended on 21 May 2022. Mura were the defending champions after winning their first title the previous season.

Maribor won their 16th title on the final day of the season after defeating reigning champions Mura 3–1. As winners, they qualified for the first qualifying round of the 2022–23 UEFA Champions League.

Competition format
Each team played 36 matches (18 home and 18 away). Teams played four matches against each other (2 home and 2 away).

Teams
Gorica were relegated after finishing last in the previous season. Radomlje were promoted from the Slovenian Second League.

Stadiums and locations
Seating capacity only; some stadiums also have standing areas.

Personnel and kits

Managerial changes

League table

Results

First half of the season

Second half of the season

PrvaLiga play-off
A two-legged play-off between the ninth-placed team from the PrvaLiga and the second-placed team from the 2021–22 Slovenian Second League was played. The winner earned a place in the 2022–23 PrvaLiga season.

Tabor Sežana won 8–3 on aggregate.

Statistics

Top scorers

See also
2021–22 Slovenian Football Cup
2021–22 Slovenian Second League

References

External links
 

Slovenian PrvaLiga seasons
Slovenia
1